Pilorcula is a genus of air-breathing land snails, terrestrial pulmonate gastropod mollusks in the family Orculidae. The species and subspecies in this genus inhabit the Caucasus and Turkey to Palestine.

Species and subspecies
Species and subspecies within the genus Pilorcula include:<ref name="Hausdorf 1996">Hausdorf, B. (1996). "Die Orculidae Asiens (Gastropoda: Stylommatophora) (Mousson 1856) (Gastropoda, Pulmonata, Clausiliidae, Phaedusinae)"]. Archiv für Molluskenkunde 125 (1/2): 1-86.</ref>

 Pilorcula aspinosa Hausdorf, 1996
 Pilorcula pusilla Hausdorf, 1996
 Pilorcula raymondi (Bourguignat, 1863) -type species
 Pilorcula trifilaris (Mousson, 1856)
 Pilorcula trifilaris anatolica Hausdorf, 1996
 Pilorcula trifilaris longior Hausdorf, 1996 
 Pilorcula trifilaris quadrifilaris (Rosen, 1905) 
 Pilorcula trifilaris trifilaris'' (Mousson, 1856)

References

Orculidae